Bami may refer to:

 Bami, Nepal
 alternative spelling of bammy, a flat and round Jamaican bread made of cassava (yuca) that is soaked in milk or water and fried
 Bakmi
 Bami goreng, an Indonesian noodle dish